Triphenylborane, often abbreviated to BPh3 where Ph is the phenyl group C6H5-, is a chemical compound with the formula B(C6H5)3. It is a white crystalline solid and is both air and moisture sensitive, slowly forming benzene and triphenylboroxine.  It is soluble in aromatic solvents.

Structure and properties
The core of the compound, BC3, has a trigonal planar structure.  The phenyl groups are rotated at about a 30° angle from the core plane.

Even though triphenylborane and tris(pentafluorophenyl)borane are structurally similar, their Lewis acidity is not.  BPh3 is a weak Lewis acid while B(C6F5)3 is a strong Lewis acid due to the electronegativity of the fluorine atoms.  Other boron Lewis acids include BF3 and BCl3.

Synthesis
Triphenylborane was first synthesized in 1922.  It is typically made with boron trifluoride diethyl etherate and the Grignard reagent, phenylmagnesium bromide.

 BF3•O(C2H5)2 + 3 C6H5MgBr → B(C6H5)3 + 3 MgBrF + (C2H5)2O

Triphenylborane can also be synthesized on a smaller scale by the thermal decomposition of trimethylammonium tetraphenylborate.

 [B(C6H5)4][NH(CH3)3] → B(C6H5)3 + N(CH3)3 + C6H6

Applications
Triphenylborane is made commercially by a process developed by Du Pont for use in its hydrocyanation of butadiene to adiponitrile, a nylon intermediate.  Du Pont produces triphenylborane by reacting sodium metal, a haloaromatic (chlorobenzene), and a secondary alkyl borate ester.

Triphenylborane can be used to make triarylborane amine complexes, such as pyridine-triphenylborane.  Triarylborane amine complexes are used as catalysts for the polymerization of acrylic esters.

References

Organoboranes
Phenyl compounds
Substances discovered in the 1920s